George Blondheim (April 10, 1956 - February 1, 2020) was a Canadian jazz musician and composer from Edmonton, Alberta. He is most noted for his work composing music for the films Angel Square, for which he won the Genie Award for Best Original Song at the 12th Genie Awards in 1991, and Whale Music, for which he was nominated for Best Original Score at the 15th Genie Awards in 1994.

He was also a two-time Gemini Award winner, winning for Best Original Music Score for a Program at the 11th Gemini Awards in 1997 for The War Between Us, and Best Original Music Score for a Dramatic Series at the 18th Gemini Awards for Da Vinci's Inquest.

Selected filmography
 The Gate II: Trespassers (1990)
 Angel Square (1990)
 Whale Music (1994)

References

External links

1956 births
2020 deaths
Canadian jazz composers
Canadian jazz pianists
Canadian film score composers
Canadian television composers
Musicians from Edmonton
Best Original Song Genie and Canadian Screen Award winners